The Tejano Music Award for Album of the Year – Norteño (formerly the Tejano Music Award for Album of the Year – Conjunto Norteño) is an honor presented annually by the Texas Talent Musicians Association (TTMA). The award was established during the rise of norteño music in the early 2000s decade. Musicians who were performers of conjunto music were also nominated for the award when it was first given out at the 24th awards ceremony, and were no longer eligible to be nominated after the TMA brought back the Tejano Music Award for Album of the Year – Conjunto at the 27th awards ceremony.

Current holder, Siggno holds the record with most wins at two. Girl group Las Fenix, remains the only female musicians to have been nominated as of 2016.

Recipients

References

External links
Official site of the Tejano Music Awards

Norteño
Norteño (music)
Awards established in 2004
Album awards